Daniël Vosmaer (c. 1630 in Delft – after 1666 in Den Briel), was a Dutch Golden Age painter.

Biography

According to the RKD, he was the son of the silversmith Arent Wouteresz, the younger brother of Abraham, the nephew of Jacob Vosmaer, and the nephew of Christiaen van Couwenbergh. Like his uncle Jacob (who was probably his first teacher), he started out painting landscapes and later switched to townscapes, perhaps because of the popularity of these after the Delft explosion of 1654. He joined the Delft guild in 1650. In 1666 he moved to Den Briel, which is probably where he later died.

References

External links
Daniel Vosmaer on PubHist
Daniël Vosmaer on Artnet
Vermeer and The Delft School, a full text exhibition catalog from The Metropolitan Museum of Art, which contains material on Daniel Vosmaer

1650 births
1666 deaths
Dutch Golden Age painters
Dutch male painters
Artists from Delft
Painters from Delft